The Punggol West Single Member Constituency (SMC) is a Single Member Constituency located in the north-eastern area of Singapore formed in 2020. The current Member of Parliament (MP) is Sun Xueling of the People's Action Party (PAP).

History 
The Punggol West SMC is a former ward of the Pasir Ris–Punggol Group Representation Constituency (GRC). During the review of electoral boundaries in March 2020 in the run up to the 2020 Singaporean general election, Punggol West SMC was carved out of Pasir Ris–Punggol GRC. 

Tan Chen Chen of the Workers' Party (WP) contested the ward against the former MP of the former ward, Sun Xueling, during the 2020 elections. Sun won the elections with 60.97% of the votes.

Town Council

Punggol West SMC, alongside Pasir Ris–Punggol GRC, is managed by Pasir Ris–Punggol Town Council.

Members of Parliament

Electoral results

Elections in 2020s

See also 
 Ang Mo Kio Group Representation Constituency
 Punggol East Single Member Constituency
 Sengkang Group Representation Constituency
 Sengkang West Single Member Constituency

References

2020 establishments in Singapore
Singaporean electoral divisions
Ang Mo Kio
Punggol
Seletar
Sengkang
Constituencies established in 2020